Indigofera amblyantha, the Chinese indigo or pink-flowered indigo, is a species of flowering plant in the family Fabaceae, native to central and southern China. A nonclimbing shrub reaching , it blooms from May to September, and is recommended for hedges, borders, massing, and containers.

References

amblyantha
Endemic flora of China
Flora of North-Central China
Flora of South-Central China
Flora of Southeast China
Plants described in 1913
Taxa named by William Grant Craib